Product marketing is sub-field of marketing that is responsible for crafting messaging, go-to-market flow, and promotion of a product. Product marketing managers can also be involved in defining and sizing target markets along with other business stakeholders such as business development and sales as well as technical functions such as product management. Other critical responsibilities include positioning and sales enablement.

Product marketing deals with marketing the product to prospects, customers, and others. Product marketing works with other areas of marketing such as social media marketing, marketing communications, online marketing, advertising, marketing strategy, and public relations, to execute outbound marketing for their product.

Role 

Product marketing addresses five strategic questions:

 What products will be offered (i.e., the breadth and depth of the product line)?
 Who will be the target customers (i.e., the boundaries of the market segments to be served)?
 How will the products reach those customers (i.e., the distribution channel and are there viable possibilities that create a solid business model)?
 At what price should the products be offered?
 How should we position the product in the minds of the customer?

To inform these decisions, Product Marketing Managers (PMMs) act as the Voice of the Customer to the company. This includes gaining a deep understanding of—and driving—customer engagement with the product, throughout its lifecycle (pre-adoption, post-adoption/purchase and after churning). PMMs collect this customer information through surveys and interviews and when available, product usage and competitive data. This informs the product roadmap, as well as driving customer product education to enhance engagement.

PMMs answer these questions and execute the strategy using the following tools and methods:
 Customer insights: interviews, surveys, focus groups, customer observation.
 Data analysis: internal and external data.
 Product validation: test and validate product ideas (the minimum viable product or rapid prototyping), before committing engineering resources.
 Market testing: optimal prices and marketing programs are developed through A/B testing of elements including language (copy), prices, product line-ups, visuals.

Relationship to other roles 

Product marketing generally performs different functions from product management. Product Managers take product requirements from sales and marketing personnel and create a product requirements document (PRD) for the engineering team. The product marketing manager creates a market requirements document (MRD), the source material for the PRD.

These roles may vary across companies. In some cases the product manager creates both MRD and PRD, while product marketing does outbound tasks such as trade show product demonstrations, marketing collateral (hot-sheets, beat-sheets, cheat sheets, data sheets and white papers). This requires skilled in competitor analysis, market research, technical writing and in financial matters (ROI and NPV analyses) and product positioning. Typical performance indicators for product marketers include feature adoption, new revenue, expansion revenue, and churn rate.

Product marketers are chartered with developing the content for sales, marketing communications, customers, and reviewers.

Qualifications 

The typical education qualification for this area of business is a marketing or business degree, e.g. a BBA, MBA, M.A./M.S. in Marketing, M.A./M.S. in I/O Psychology, along with work experience. A key skill is to be able to interact with technical staff, increasing the value of a background in engineering or computing.

References

External links

Product management